The Mathias Peterson Homestead is a historic log house in Mission Hill, South Dakota. It was built in 1880 by Pete Peterson Hovden, with "a gable roof with wooden shingles and a small gabled portice marking
the off-set front door." It has been listed on the National Register of Historic Places since April 16, 1980.

References

	
National Register of Historic Places in Yankton County, South Dakota
Houses completed in 1880